Julie Schonfeld is the first female rabbi to serve in the chief executive position of an American rabbinical association, having been named the executive vice president of the Conservative movement's Rabbinical Assembly (RA) in 2008 and later Chief Executive Officer of the RA.

She is also a member of the President's Advisory Council on Faith-Based and Neighborhood Partnerships.

Schonfeld was ordained by the Jewish Theological Seminary of America and also has a degree from Yale University.

In 2011, Jewish Women International named her one of "10 Women to Watch in 5772."

In 2012, she was part of a mission of religious leaders that went on a six-city tour to Indonesia, Jordan, the Palestinian Authority, and Israel to highlight the role of religion in advancing Middle East peace.

She opposed the controversial arrest of a woman for wearing a tallit at the Western Wall.

See also
Timeline of women rabbis

References

American Conservative rabbis
Conservative women rabbis
Yale University alumni